The LSU Gymnastics Training Facility is a gymnastics facility located on the campus of Louisiana State University in Baton Rouge, LA. The facility, opened in 2016, serves as the stand-alone practice facility for the LSU Tigers women's gymnastics team.

The training facility is a 38,000 square foot facility with approximately 18,000 square feet of practice space in the gym area. The practice area features four competition-style beams, three vault runways with various surfaces for landings, four sets of uneven bars and a floor exercise area. The facility also includes the team locker room, coaches locker rooms, training room, cardio area, dance studio, team squad room, a video review room with theater seating that is also the team meeting room. It also includes an equipment storage area, a multi-purpose room that hosts team functions and a roof-top terrace.

The facility won multiple awards for interior design when it opened in 2016. It was awarded the 2016 Award of Recognition International Interior Design Association and 2016 Design Excellence Silver Award American Society of Interior Designers.

Gallery

See also
LSU Tigers women's gymnastics
LSU Tigers and Lady Tigers

References

External links
LSU Gymnastics Training Facility

College gymnastics venues in the United States
Gymnastics venues in Louisiana
LSU Tigers women's gymnastics venues
Sports venues in Louisiana
Sports venues completed in 2016
2016 establishments in Louisiana